Occupational Medicine is a defunct peer-reviewed scientific journal of medicine. It was published from 1986 to 2002 by Hanley & Belfus. The journal was then absorbed by Clinics in Occupational and Environmental Medicine.

Indexing and abstracting
During its publication, Occupational Medicine was indexed and abstracted in the following bibliographic databases:
Index medicus
MEDLINE
PubMed

Occupational safety and health journals
Publications established in 1986
Publications disestablished in 2002
English-language journals